This is a list of earthquakes in 2005. Only earthquakes of magnitude 6 or above are included, unless they resulted in significant damage or casualties, or were notable for some other reason. All dates are listed according to UTC time. To prevent this list from becoming unmanageable, only earthquakes of magnitude 6 or above are included, unless they are notable for some other reason.

Compared to other years

Overall

By death toll

By magnitude

By month

January
  Northern Sumatra was struck by a magnitude 6.7 earthquake that occurred on January 1.
  The Nicobar Islands were struck by a magnitude 6.1 earthquake that occurred on January 1.
  The Nicobar Islands were struck by a magnitude 6.4 earthquake that occurred on January 2.
  Macquarie Island was struck by a magnitude 6.1 earthquake that occurred on January 3.
  The Andaman Islands were struck by a magnitude 6.1 earthquake that occurred on January 4.
  The South Sandwich Islands were struck by a magnitude 6.0 earthquake that occurred on January 8.
  Northern Sumatra was struck by a magnitude 6.1 earthquake that occurred on January 9.
  Gorgan, Iran was struck by a magnitude 5.4 earthquake that occurred on January 10. There were no fatalities, but at least 110 people were injured.
  Western Turkey was struck by a magnitude 5.5 earthquake that occurred on January 10. One person was injured.
 The central Mid-Atlantic Ridge was struck by a magnitude 6.8 earthquake that occurred on January 12.
  Papua New Guinea was struck by a magnitude 6.1 earthquake that occurred on January 14.
  The Sunda Strait was struck by a magnitude 6.0 earthquake that occurred on January 15.
  Fiji was struck by a magnitude 6.2 earthquake that occurred on January 16.
  The Caroline Islands were struck by a magnitude 6.6 earthquake that occurred on January 16.
  The Caroline Islands were struck by a magnitude 6.1 earthquake that occurred on January 17.
  Hokkaido was struck by a magnitude 6.3 earthquake that occurred on January 18.
  Honshu was struck by a magnitude 6.6 earthquake that occurred on January 19. A tsunami with a wave height of 30 cm was recorded.
  Ecuador was struck by a magnitude 6.0 earthquake that occurred on January 21.
  The Solomon Islands were struck by a magnitude 6.4 earthquake that occurred on January 22.
  Sulawesi was struck by a magnitude 6.3 earthquake that occurred on January 23. One person was killed and four injured.
  The Nicobar Islands were struck by a magnitude 6.3 earthquake that occurred on January 24.
  Ecuador was struck by a magnitude 6.1 earthquake that occurred on January 24.
  Yunnan was struck by a magnitude 4.8 earthquake that occurred on January 25. Three people were injured.
 – The Turkey–Iraq border was struck by a magnitude 5.9 earthquake that occurred on January 25. Two people killed and 22 injured. 80 buildings were damaged.
  Northern Sumatra was struck by a magnitude 6.2 earthquake that occurred on January 26.
  Ecuador was struck by a magnitude 6.1 earthquake that occurred on January 28.
  Ecuador was struck by a magnitude 6.2 earthquake that occurred on January 28.

February
  Java was struck by a magnitude 4.8 earthquake that occurred on February 2. One person killed and many injured.
  The Mariana Islands were struck by a magnitude 6.3 earthquake that occurred on February 2.
  The Mariana Islands was struck by a magnitude 6.6 earthquake that occurred on February 5.
  Mindanao was struck by a magnitude 7.1 earthquake that occurred on February 5.
  Northern Sumatra was struck by a magnitude 6.0 earthquake that occurred on February 5.
  Papua New Guinea was struck by a magnitude 6.1 earthquake that occurred on February 7.
  Vanuatu was struck by a magnitude 6.7 earthquake that occurred on February 8.
  Northern Sumatra was struck by a magnitude 6.0 earthquake that occurred on February 9.
  The Bonin Islands were struck by a magnitude 6.3 earthquake that occurred on February 9.
  The Loyalty Islands were struck by a magnitude 6.3 earthquake that occurred on February 10.
 – The Kyrgyzstan–China border was struck by a magnitude 6.1 earthquake that occurred on February 14. At least 6,000 homes destroyed or damaged.
  Kepulauan Talaud was struck by a magnitude 6.5 earthquake that occurred on February 15.
  Honshu was struck by a magnitude 5.5 earthquake that occurred on February 15. Seven people were injured.
 The southern Mid-Atlantic Ridge was struck by a magnitude 6.6 earthquake that occurred on February 16.
  Sulawesi was struck by a magnitude 6.5 earthquake that occurred on February 19.
  Central Iran was struck by a magnitude 6.4 earthquake that occurred on February 22. 612 dead, 1,411 injured. 4 villages were completely destroyed, and 30% to 70% of buildings in more than 40 villages were reported damaged.
  Papua New Guinea was struck by a magnitude 6.0 earthquake that occurred on February 23.
  Simeulue was struck by a magnitude 6.8 earthquake that occurred on February 26.

March 
  The Banda Sea was struck by a magnitude 7.1 earthquake that occurred on March 2.
  Quetta was struck by a magnitude 4.9 earthquake that occurred on March 2, injuring 1 person.
  Taiwan was struck by a magnitude 5.7 earthquake that occurred on March 5, injuring 2 people.
  The Solomon Islands were struck by a magnitude 6.1 earthquake that occurred on March 6.
  Severnaya Zemlya was struck by a magnitude 6.3 earthquake that occurred on March 6.
  South Africa was struck by a magnitude 5.0 earthquake that occurred on March 9, killing 2 people and injuring 58.
  Iran was struck by a magnitude 6.0 earthquake that occurred on March 13.
  India was struck by a magnitude 4.9 earthquake that occurred on March 14, injuring 16 people.
  Guatemala was struck by a magnitude 6.1 earthquake that occurred on March 17.
  Tonga was struck by a magnitude 6.1 earthquake that occurred on March 19.
  Fiji was struck by a magnitude 6.3 earthquake that occurred on March 19.
  Fukuoka was struck by a magnitude 6.6 earthquake that occurred on March 20, killing 1 person.
  Kyushu was struck by a magnitude 6.6 earthquake that occurred on March 20.
  Argentina was struck by a magnitude 6.9 earthquake that occurred on March 21.
  Argentina was struck by a magnitude 6.4 earthquake that occurred on March 21.
  The Banda Sea was struck by a magnitude 6.1 earthquake that occurred on March 26.
  Sumatra was struck by a magnitude 8.7 earthquake that occurred on March 28, killing +1,000 people.
  The Nias region was struck by a magnitude 6.1 earthquake that occurred on March 28.
  Simeulue was struck by a magnitude 6.3 earthquake that occurred on March 30.
  Fiji was struck by a magnitude 6.1 earthquake that occurred on March 30.
  Fiji was struck by a magnitude 6.0 earthquake that occurred on March 31.

April 
  Svalbard was struck by a magnitude 6.1 earthquake that occurred on April 2.
  The Nias region was struck by a magnitude 6.0 earthquake that occurred on April 3.
  Northern Sumatra was struck by a magnitude 6.3 earthquake that occurred on April 3.
  Xizang was struck by a magnitude 6.3 earthquake that occurred on April 7.
  Kepulauan Batu was struck by a magnitude 6.1 earthquake that occurred on April 8.
  The Loyalty Islands were struck by a magnitude 6.1 earthquake that occurred on April 8.
  Kodiak Island was struck by a magnitude 6.0 earthquake that occurred on April 9.
  Kepulauan Mentawai was struck by a magnitude 6.7 earthquake that occurred on April 10.
  Kepulauan Mentawai was struck by a magnitude 6.5 earthquake that occurred on April 10.
  Kepulauan Mentawai was struck by a magnitude 6.4 earthquake that occurred on April 10.
  Simeulue was struck by a magnitude 6.1 earthquake that occurred on April 11.
  Papua New Guinea was struck by a magnitude 6.6 earthquake that occurred on April 11.
  Peru was struck by a magnitude 6.0 earthquake that occurred on April 11.
  The Loyalty Islands were struck by a magnitude 6.8 earthquake that occurred on April 11.
  The Nias region was struck by a magnitude 6.4 earthquake that occurred on April 16.
  Kyushu was struck by a magnitude 5.5 earthquake that occurred on April 19, injuring 58.
  Simeulue was struck by a magnitude 6.2 earthquake that occurred on April 28.

May 
  Iran was struck by a magnitude 4.9 earthquake that occurred on May 3.
  Panama was struck by a magnitude 6.5 earthquake that occurred on May 5.
  Sumatra was struck by a magnitude 6.3 earthquake that occurred on May 10.
 The Pacific–Antarctic Ridge was struck by a magnitude 6.5 earthquake that occurred on May 12.
  The Nias region was struck by a magnitude 6.7 earthquake that occurred on May 14.
  The Kermadec Islands were struck by a magnitude 6.6 earthquake that occurred on May 16.
  The South Sandwich Islands were struck by a magnitude 6.0 earthquake that occurred on May 18.
  Tonga was struck by a magnitude 6.2 earthquake that occurred on May 18.
  Northern Sumatra was struck by a magnitude 6.1 earthquake that occurred on May 18.
  The Nias region was struck by a magnitude 6.9 earthquake that occurred on May 19.
  Fiji was struck by a magnitude 6.0 earthquake that occurred on May 20.
 – The Peru–Ecuador border was struck by a magnitude 6.3 earthquake that occurred on May 21.
  South Africa was struck by a magnitude 4.3 earthquake that occurred on May 23. Nineteen miners were injured in a mine collapse at Carletonville.

June 
  Argentina was struck by a magnitude 6.1 earthquake that occurred on June 2.
  Papua New Guinea was struck by a magnitude 6.1 earthquake that occurred on June 4, killing one person and destroying many houses.
  Eastern Turkey was struck by a magnitude 5.6 earthquake that occurred on June 6, with five people seriously injured.
  Simeulue was struck by a magnitude 6.1 earthquake that occurred on June 8.
  The South Sandwich Islands were struck by a magnitude 6.0 earthquake that occurred on June 12.
  California was struck by a magnitude 5.2 earthquake that occurred on June 12. Several small rockslides occurred on Highway 74.
  The Tarapacá Region was struck by a magnitude 7.8 earthquake that occurred on June 13, killing 10 people.
  The Rat Islands were struck by a magnitude 6.8 earthquake that occurred on June 14.
  California was struck by a magnitude 7.5 earthquake that occurred on June 15. A tsunami was generated with a maximum recorded wave height of 26 cm at Crescent City.
  California was struck by a magnitude 7.2 earthquake that occurred on June 15.
  Papua New Guinea was struck by a magnitude 6.2 earthquake that occurred on June 15.
  Chile was struck by a magnitude 6.4 earthquake that occurred on June 15.
  California was struck by a magnitude 6.6 earthquake that occurred on June 17.
  Mexico was struck by a magnitude 6.2 earthquake that occurred on June 27.

July 
  Managua was struck by a magnitude 6.1 earthquake that occurred on July 2.
 The Prince Edward Islands were struck by a magnitude 6.3 earthquake that occurred on July 4.
  Indonesia was struck by a magnitude 6.2 earthquake that occurred on July 5. Many buildings were damaged.
  South Africa was struck by a magnitude 2.7 earthquake that occurred on July 5. One miner was killed in Carletonville.
 The west Chile Rise was struck by a magnitude 6.1 earthquake that occurred on July 10.
 The Kermadec Islands were struck by a magnitude 6.0 earthquake that occurred on July 11.
  The Kermadec Islands were struck by a magnitude 6.0 earthquake that occurred on July 23.
  Tokyo was struck by a magnitude 5.9 earthquake that occurred on July 23, injuring 27 people and damaging one building.
  The Nicobar Islands were struck by a magnitude 7.2 earthquake that occurred on July 24. Many buildings were damaged.
  Heilongjiang was struck by a magnitude 5.0 earthquake that occurred on July 25, killing one person.
  Dillon, Montana was struck by a magnitude 5.6 earthquake that occurred on July 25, with minor to moderate damage to dozens of buildings, and felt throughout much of the inter-mountain West.
 The Balleny Islands were struck by a magnitude 6.0 earthquake that occurred on July 30.

August 
  Nicaragua was struck by a magnitude 6.3 earthquake that occurred on August 3.
  Yunnan was struck by a magnitude 5.2 earthquake that occurred on August 5, injuring 9 people.
  Tonga was struck by a magnitude 6.0 earthquake that occurred on August 6.
 The Prince Edward Islands were struck by a magnitude 6.2 earthquake that occurred on August 7.
  Fiji was struck by a magnitude 6.0 earthquake that occurred on August 7.
  Vanuatu was struck by a magnitude 6.1 earthquake that occurred on August 9.
  Vanuatu was struck by a magnitude 6.1 earthquake that occurred on August 9.
  The Loyalty Islands were struck by a magnitude 6.2 earthquake that occurred on August 11.
  The Northern Mariana Islands were struck by a magnitude 6.0 earthquake that occurred on August 13.
  Yunnan was struck by a magnitude 4.8 earthquake that occurred on August 13, injuring 26 people.
  Honshu was struck by a magnitude 7.2 earthquake that occurred on August 16, injuring 39 people. 
  Honshu was struck by a magnitude 7.2 earthquake that occurred on August 16.
  Honshu was struck by a magnitude 4.8 earthquake that occurred on August 21, injuring 2 people.
  Honshu was struck by a magnitude 6.1 earthquake that occurred on August 24.
  The Gulf of Aden was struck by a magnitude 6.2 earthquake that occurred on August 26.
  Panama was struck by a magnitude 6.1 earthquake that occurred on August 27.
  Honshu was struck by a magnitude 6.1 earthquake that occurred on August 30.

September 
  The Celebes Sea was struck by a magnitude 6.0 earthquake that occurred on September 4.
 The Pacific–Antarctic Ridge was struck by a magnitude 6.2 earthquake that occurred on September 5.
  New Ireland was struck by a magnitude 7.6 earthquake that occurred on September 9. 
  The Kuril Islands were struck by a magnitude 6.1 earthquake that occurred on September 21.
  Ethiopia was struck by a magnitude 5.5 earthquake that occurred on September 24. A 500-meter wide zone of tensional fissures and normal faults up to 3 km long was observed in the Dabbahu area. Displacement on some scarps was as much as 1 meter. Dabbahu Volcano began erupting, with the largest eruption occurring on September 26. An estimated 6,500 people were displaced, about 1,000 livestock were killed and roads and water facilities were damaged by the eruption.
  Vanuatu was struck by a magnitude 6.1 earthquake that occurred on September 25.
  Loreto was struck by a magnitude 7.5 earthquake that occurred on September 26, killing 20 people and injuring 266 others.
  New Britain was struck by a magnitude 6.6 earthquake that occurred on September 29.
  New Britain was struck by a magnitude 6.2 earthquake that occurred on September 29.

October 
  Moquegua was struck by a magnitude 5.3 earthquake that occurred on October 1, injuring 12 people.
  Pakistan was struck by a magnitude 7.6 earthquake that occurred on October 8, killing +85,000. Felt in Afghanistan and India. It was the strongest earthquake in the region in more than a century.
  Pakistan was struck by a magnitude 6.2 earthquake that occurred on October 8.
  Kashmir was struck by a magnitude 5.2 earthquake that occurred on October 15, killing 2 people. Felt in Islamabad.
  The Kuril Islands was struck by a magnitude 6.1 earthquake that occurred on October 15.
  Taiwan was struck by a magnitude 6.4 earthquake that occurred on October 15.
  Tokyo was struck by a magnitude 5.0 earthquake that occurred on October 16, injuring 2 people.
  Honshu was struck by a magnitude 6.3 earthquake that occurred on October 19.
  Guangxi was struck by a magnitude 4.2 earthquake that occurred on October 27, killing 1 person.
 The Southeast Indian Ridge was struck by a magnitude 6.5 earthquake that occurred on October 29.

November 
  The Bismarck Sea was struck by a magnitude 6.4 earthquake that occurred on November 5.
  Honshu was struck by a magnitude 7.0 earthquake that occurred on November 14.
  Bolivia was struck by a magnitude 6.8 earthquake that occurred on November 17.
  Simeulue was struck by a magnitude 6.5 earthquake that occurred on November 19.
  Unimak Island was struck by a magnitude 6.2 earthquake that occurred on November 20.
  Kyushu was struck by a magnitude 6.1 earthquake that occurred on November 21.
  Papua New Guinea was struck by a magnitude 6.2 earthquake that occurred on November 22.
  Jiangxi was struck by a magnitude 5.2 earthquake that occurred on November 26, killing 16 people.
  Iran was struck by a magnitude 5.9 earthquake that occurred on November 27, killing 13 people.
  The Northern Mariana Islands were struck by a magnitude 6.0 earthquake that occurred on November 28.
  Mindanao was struck by a magnitude 6.4 earthquake that occurred on November 30.

December 
  Honshu was struck by a magnitude 6.5 earthquake that occurred on December 2.
 – Congo–Tanzania border was struck by a magnitude 6.8 earthquake that occurred on December 5, killing 3 people.
 The Kermadec Islands were struck by a magnitude 6.4 earthquake that occurred on December 7.
  Papua New Guinea was struck by a magnitude 6.1 earthquake that occurred on December 8.
  Papua New Guinea was struck by a magnitude 6.6 earthquake that occurred on December 11.
  Hindu Kush was struck by a magnitude 6.5 earthquake that occurred on December 12, killing 5 people.
  Fiji was struck by a magnitude 6.7 earthquake that occurred on December 13.
  Uttarakhand was struck by a magnitude 5.1 earthquake that occurred on December 14, killing 1 person.
  Honshu was struck by a magnitude 6.0 earthquake that occurred on December 16.
  The Federated States of Micronesia was struck by a magnitude 6.1 earthquake that occurred on December 20.
  The Molucca Sea was struck by a magnitude 6.3 earthquake that occurred on December 21.
  Panama was struck by a magnitude 6.0 earthquake that occurred on December 21.
 The Pacific–Antarctic Ridge was struck by a magnitude 6.3 earthquake that occurred on December 22.
  Ecuador was struck by a magnitude 6.1 earthquake that occurred on December 23.
  Honshu was struck by a magnitude 4.8 earthquake that occurred on December 24, injuring 1 person.
  Panama was struck by a magnitude 6.1 earthquake that occurred on December 30.

See also
 List of 21st-century earthquakes

References

Significant Earthquakes of the World, 2005

2005
2005